Goce Georgievski (born 12 February 1987) is a Macedonian handball player for RK Vardar 1961 and the North Macedonia national team.

Achievements
RK Metalurg Skopje
 Macedonian Handball Super League
Winners : 2005-06, 2007-08, 2009-10, 2010-11, 2011-12 and 2013-14

 Macedonian Handball Cup
Winners : 2006, 2009, 2010, 2011 2013 and 2021

European competitions                          
                                      
EHF Challenge Cup:
 Winners: 2018–19
CSM București
RK Vardar
 Macedonian Handball Super League
 Winner:2021, 2022
 Macedonian Handball Cup
 Winner:2021, 2022

References

External links

Macedonian male handball players
Living people
Sportspeople from Skopje
1987 births
Macedonian expatriate sportspeople in France
Macedonian expatriate sportspeople in Romania
Expatriate handball players